Pedro Ceballos (born September 8, 1990) is a Venezuelan freestyle wrestler. He competed in the men's freestyle 86 kg event at the 2016 Summer Olympics, in which he lost the bronze medal match to Sharif Sharifov.

He won the gold medal in his event at the 2022 Bolivarian Games held in Valledupar, Colombia. He also won the gold medal in his event at the 2022 South American Games held in Asunción, Paraguay.

References

External links
 

1990 births
Living people
Venezuelan male sport wrestlers
Olympic wrestlers of Venezuela
Wrestlers at the 2016 Summer Olympics
Wrestlers at the 2015 Pan American Games
South American Games gold medalists for Venezuela
South American Games medalists in wrestling
Competitors at the 2018 South American Games
Competitors at the 2022 South American Games
Wrestlers at the 2019 Pan American Games
Pan American Games medalists in wrestling
Pan American Games silver medalists for Venezuela
Medalists at the 2019 Pan American Games
20th-century Venezuelan people
21st-century Venezuelan people